Events from the year 1597 in India.

Events
 Amar Singh I becomes Maharana of Mewar, Udaipur and rules until his death in 1620. 
 Dom Francisco de Gama becomes viceroy of India (until 1600)

Births

Deaths
 19 January – Maharana Pratap, Hindu Rajput ruler of Mewar (born 1540)
 5 February – Gonsalo Garcia, Roman Catholic Franciscan friar from India (born 1556)

References

See also
 Timeline of Indian history

 
India